The following lists events that happened during 2016 in Guatemala.

Incumbents
Acting President: Alejandro Maldonado, 3 September 2015-current
President-elect: Jimmy Morales, will take office on 14 January

Events
Police arrested Manuel Benedicto Lucas Garcia, brother of former President Fernando Romeo Lucas García, and 13 others on 7 January on suspicion of involvement in the murders of 558 people during the Guatemalan Civil War.
Soldiers shoot a 13-year-old boy named Julio Rene Alvarado Ruano and his younger border on the Belieze-Guatemala border starting border tensions.

Public holidays

See also

Timeline of Guatemalan history

References

 
2010s in Guatemala
Years of the 21st century in Guatemala
Guatemala